Cyprian Ojwang Omollo (died 3 March 2017) was a Kenyan politician. He belonged to the Orange Democratic Movement and was elected to represent the Uriri Constituency in the National Assembly of Kenya since the 2007 Kenyan parliamentary election. He lost his seat in the 2013 elections.

References

Year of birth missing
2017 deaths
Members of the National Assembly (Kenya)
Orange Democratic Movement politicians